Jurgis Kairys (born May 6, 1952, in Krasnoyarsk) is a Lithuanian aerobatic pilot and aeronautical engineer. He has won many awards for his flying and has invented several maneuvers, including the "Kairys Wheel."  He helped develop the Sukhoi Su-26, -29, and -31 aerobatic aircraft, and also has manufactured his own aerobatic aircraft, called the "Juka."

His most famous stunt is flying inverted under a pedestrian bridge (height 7 meters) over the Nemunas River wash in Kaunas on September 2, 2000, (nicknamed Ultraflight).  He also flew under all bridges over the Neris River in Vilnius on September 18, 1999, (nicknamed Flight of the Century).

Biography
Jurgis Kairys was born in Krasnoyarsk, on May 6, 1952, where his parents were deported by Soviet authorities. However, the family was able to return to Lithuania when Kairys was still a small boy. His interest in flying started at an early age when watching planes landing and taking off at an airstrip near his home in Lithuania. He became an airframe engineer and was able to start flying aerobatics at the Kaunas Flying Club. His talents and determination were obvious and he soon became a member of the elite national team.

The style of acrobatics we see today was developed over twenty years ago by Lithuanians Stepas Artiškevičius and Kairys competing with each other while on the Soviet team, and coaching each other. Today every unlimited pilot flies in the style promoted by the soviet aerobatics society in the 70s.

His engineering and piloting skills were recognized when he was asked to work with the Sukhoi Design Bureau to develop the Sukhoi 26, 29 and 31 series of completely new aerobatics aircraft using new ideas future to dominate the Unlimited World Aerobatic Championships. This was achieved with the aircraft winning many championships from the European Championships to the World Grand Prix of Aerobatics piloted by Kairys and the Russian team members. This legacy continues to this date with the Su31 winning again in the 2003 WAC in Lakeland, Florida.

Jurgis' forte has always been Unlimited Freestyle aerobatics which has allowed him to develop his quest for new flight possibilities from himself and his aircraft. He recently flew his own creation in the form of the "Juka" aircraft and has since been fine-tuning this aircraft for future displays and competitions.

He has invented several aerobatics maneuvers including the Kairys Wheel, Small Loop and was the first to successfully perform the Pugachev's Cobra maneuver in a propeller-driven aircraft.

See also
Competition aerobatics

External links

Jurgis Kairys— leader of Airbandits team of aerobatics 
Video of inverted flight under bridge

1952 births
Living people
Aerobatic pilots
Lithuanian aerospace engineers
Lithuanian air racers
Lithuanian aviators
People from Krasnoyarsk
Red Bull Air Race World Championship pilots
Soviet engineers
20th-century engineers
Soviet aviators